The 2021 Open d'Orléans was a professional tennis tournament played on indoor hard courts. It was the sixteenth edition of the tournament which was part of the 2021 ATP Challenger Tour. It took place in Orléans, France between 27 September and 3 October 2021.

Singles main-draw entrants

Seeds

 1 Rankings are as of 20 September 2021.

Other entrants
The following players received wildcards into the singles main draw:
  Ugo Humbert
  Harold Mayot
  Corentin Moutet

The following player received entry into the singles main draw as an alternate:
  Ruben Bemelmans

The following players received entry from the qualifying draw:
  Kyrian Jacquet
  Evgeny Karlovskiy
  Brayden Schnur
  Matteo Viola

The following player received entry as a lucky loser:
  Hugo Grenier

Champions

Singles

  Henri Laaksonen def.  Dennis Novak 6–1, 2–6, 6–2.

Doubles

  Pierre-Hugues Herbert /  Albano Olivetti def.  Antoine Hoang /  Kyrian Jacquet 6–2, 2–6, [11–9].

References

2021 ATP Challenger Tour
 
2021 in French tennis